The All-Ireland Vocational Schools Championship was a Gaelic Athletic Association football and hurling competition. There are two levels of competition. Individual schools compete for county, provincial and All-Ireland competitions. County teams selected from schools within each county also competed for provincial and All-Ireland competitions. The final intercounty championships in both codes were played in 2012, while the last schools championships were played in 2013.

Intercounty Championship

Football Roll of Honour

Hurling Roll of Honour

Individual Schools Championships

Senior Football Roll of Honour

Colaiste Na Sceilge, Caherciveen are the only school to have won the two All-Ireland senior "A" secondary school competitions available, the vocational schools "A" championship (2000) and the Hogan Cup (2009)

Senior Hurling Roll of Honour

 1990 Moneenageisha awarded match after objection

The following is a list of the top teams by number of wins:

Junior Football Roll of Honour

Junior Hurling Roll of Honour

References

External links
Irish Examiner April 7th, 2008
2011 Intercounty hurling final report
 Report on 2012 Intercounty hurling final

Vocational Schools Championship
Vocational Schools Championship